The following highways are numbered 369:

Brazil
 BR-369

Canada
 Quebec Route 369
Saskatchewan Highway 369

India
 National Highway 369 (India)

Japan
 Japan National Route 369

United States
  Interstate 369 (Texas)
  Interstate 369 (Kentucky) (proposed)
  Florida State Road 369 (unsigned designation for U.S. Route 319)
  Georgia State Route 369
  New York State Route 369
  Ohio State Route 369
  Puerto Rico Highway 369
  Tennessee State Route 369
  Texas State Highway Loop 369
  Virginia State Route 369